Bombyliomyia is a genus of bristle flies in the family Tachinidae. There are about nine described species in Bombyliomyia.

Species
These nine species belong to the genus Bombyliomyia:
 Bombyliomyia albiceps (Wulp, 1888) c g
 Bombyliomyia concolor Engel, 1920 c g
 Bombyliomyia flavipalpis (Macquart, 1846) c g
 Bombyliomyia flavitarsis (Macquart, 1846) c
 Bombyliomyia gabana (Townsend, 1914) c
 Bombyliomyia nigra (Townsend, 1914) c g
 Bombyliomyia patula (Walker, 1849) c g
 Bombyliomyia purpurea Thompson, 1963 c g
 Bombyliomyia soror (Williston, 1886) i c g b
Data sources: i = ITIS, c = Catalogue of Life, g = GBIF, b = Bugguide.net

References

Further reading

External links

 
 

Tachininae